Ross Vintcent (born 5 June 2002) is a South african-born Italian rugby union player, currently playing for University of Exeter and as Additional Player for Exeter Chiefs. His preferred position is flanker.

Vintcent was named in the F.I.R. Academy for the 2020–2021 and 2021–22 seasons, having been allocated by the Italian Rugby Union. In May 2022 he was added at list of Permit player of Zebre Parma. He made his debut in the re-arranged Round 12 of the 2021–22 United Rugby Championship against .

In 2021 and 2022, Vintcent was named in Italy U20s squad for annual Six Nations Under 20s Championship. On 10 January 2023, he was named in Italy A squad for a uncapped test against Romania A.

References

2002 births
Living people
Italian rugby union players
Zebre Parma players
Rugby union flankers
Rugby union number eights